Aurora, officially the Province of Aurora, is a province in the Philippines located in the eastern part of Central Luzon region, facing the Philippine Sea. Its capital is Baler and borders, clockwise from the south, the provinces of Quezon, Bulacan, Nueva Ecija, Nueva Vizcaya, Quirino, and Isabela.

Before 1979, Aurora was part of the province of Quezon. Aurora was, in fact, named after Aurora Aragon, the wife of Pres. Manuel L. Quezon, the president of the Philippine Commonwealth, after whom the mother province was named.

History

Spanish era
In 1572, the Spanish explorer Juan de Salcedo became the first European to visit the region that would be known as Aurora while he was exploring the northern coast of Luzon. Salcedo reportedly visited the towns of Casiguran, Baler and Infanta.

In the early days of the Spanish colonial period, Aurora was ecclesiastically linked to Infanta, which today rests further south, in northern Quezon. The earliest missionaries in the province were the Franciscans, who had established missions in Baler and Casiguran in 1609. Due to lack of available personnel, the region was given to the jurisdiction of the Augustinians and Recollects in 1658, but was returned to the Friars Minor in 1703. Other early missions included Dipaculao, established in 1719, and Casiguran, in 1753.

District of El Principe
The early history of Aurora is linked to Quezon province, of which it formed a part, and Nueva Ecija, under which the area was governed as the District of El Príncipe. North Aurora was part of Nueva Vizcaya. In 1902, the district was separated from Nueva Ecija and the northern area was separated from Nueva Vizcaya in 1905 and both transferred to the province of Tayabas (now Quezon).

Independence
Aurora became a sub-province of Quezon in 1951 through Republic Act No. 648 under the presidency of Elpidio Quirino, after whom its neighboring province was named, and finally became an independent province during the presidency of Ferdinand E. Marcos, through Batas Pambansa Blg. 7 enacted on November 21, 1978.

Administrative assignment
As original part of the province of Quezon, Aurora was part of the Southern Tagalog Region (Region IV). Upon the issuance of Executive Order No. 103, dated May 17, 2002, by then-President Gloria Macapagal-Arroyo, the province of Aurora was moved to Central Luzon (Region III), geographical location of the province. The provinces south of Aurora formed as Calabarzon and Mimaropa, and Southern Tagalog was limited to being a cultural-geographic region.

Geography 
To the north, it is bordered by the Northern Sierra Madre Natural Park of Isabela, to the west by the central range of the Sierra Madre which contains the Casecnan Protected Landscape and Aurora Memorial National Park, to the south by the Umiray River, and to the east by the Philippine Sea which opens to the Pacific Ocean. The San Ildefonso Peninsula lies in the province's northern portion between the Philippine Sea and the Casiguran Sound.

Topography
The province covers a portion of the Sierra Madre mountain range. As such, the elevation is generally steep to very steep and only about 14% of the province's total area is flat.

Climate
Aurora's climate is classified as Tropical rainforest climate. It experiences significant rainfall throughout the year. Because the coastal province faces the Pacific Ocean, it is frequently visited by typhoons.

Administrative divisions

Aurora is politically subdivided into 8 municipalities, all encompassed by a lone legislative district.

Barangays
The 8 municipalities of the province comprise a total of 151 barangays, with Suclayin in Baler as the most populous in 2010, and Dibalo in San Luis as the least.

Demographics

There are also pockets of Bugkalots & Negritos, called Dumagats. Most Dumagats are living in the hillsides or mountains. They are believed to have result from a fusion of Austronesian and Melanesian ancestries, and survive from fishing and hunting. There are three kinds of Dumagats in Aurora province, the Umiray Dumagat, Casiguran Dumagat, and the Palanan Dumagat.

Tagalogs, some originating from Palanan and Infanta, Quezon, came in to the area to trade by boat, some Tagalogs settled in Aurora (especially Baler) and married with the Aeta and Bugkalots. The Spanish brought in Filipino acolytes from other areas of Luzon from 1609 to 1899. During this period, Baler can only be access by sea though the town saw increase migration from other parts of Luzon such as Laguna, Tayabas, and Bicol from the south. The opening of the Baler-Bongabon Road allowed easier migration of people from Ilocos and Isabela areas from the north. The road also allowed Igorot people and Batangueño Tagalogs to settle in Baler & other places of Aurora. In 1896, a group of Ilocanos from Aringay, La Union  came to settle in San Jose, now called Maria Aurora; in 1906, another group of Ilocanos arrived from La Union and Pangasinan. In the early 1920s, Ilocano settlers from Central Luzon settled a Bugkalot territory Dipaculao, which in turn was derived from the phrase Dipac naulaw or Naulaw ni Dipac, the Ilocano for "Dipac got dizzy", idiomatically "Dipac is/got drunk", Dipac is the name of a Bugkalot chief; another group of Ilocano settlers arrived from La Union, Pangasinan, and other areas of Ilocos Region.

Languages
The Tagalog and Ilocano languages are spoken by their respective ethnic groups. The province primarily speaks a Tagalog dialect that is sometimes locally called Baler Tagalog, with Tayabas Tagalog similarities and the presence of Ilocano loanwords. Being a Tagalog-speaking province is the reason for Aurora being a former part of Southern Tagalog, which is more of a cultural-geographical region at present. The Tagalog dialect of Aurorans is also known for distinctive expressions like akkaw, which is used to express surprise, wonder, disgust, and objection; it is also akin to the English term Wow! Other regional expressions spoken in Aurora are are(h), which is used to express surprise in a negative way, anin which is used to express regret or pity on a situation, and many words also spoken in neighboring Quezon like adyo, meaning "climb" and puropur to pertain to rain with gusty wind. Ilocano spoken in Aurora was affected by Tayabas Tagalog accent. Most English is spoken in the municipalities of Baler and Maria Aurora.

Religion

The people of Aurora are heavily Christianized (large majority being Roman Catholic by 87%) as a result of hundreds of years of Spanish colonization. Some other Christian believers are also present which includes Methodists, Aglipayan Church, Baptists, Born Again Christians, Jehovah's Witnesses, Members Church of God International, Iglesia ni Cristo and Seventh-day Adventist while Muslims are also found which presence is traced to migration by some people from some parts of Mindanao. Muslims, Anitists, animists, and atheists are also present in the province.

Economy

Corn crops, rice and other major agricultural crops are grown in Aurora. It has a total of 38, 928 or 13% of provincial Land Area of Agricultural land. It also has  of rice plantation that averages 24,000 tons every year.

Aurora Pacific Economic Zone
Casiguran is home to the Aurora Pacific Economic Zone and Freeport Authority or APECO a special economic zone located in this coastal town. Created in 2007 by virtue of Republic Act No. 9490 through the efforts of Sen. Edgardo Angara and Rep. Juan Edgardo Angara, it is expected be a major transshipment hub going to the pacific region. It aims to boost social, economic and industrial developments in Aurora and nearby provinces by generating jobs for the people, improving the quality of their living conditions, advocating an eco-friendly approach to industrialization and enhancing the potential of the community in productivity.

Gallery

Notable people
 

Sonny Angara, senator since 2013.
Bellaflor Angara-Castillo, governor from 2004 to 2013.

See also 
 Aurora Quezon
 Siege of Baler
 Sierra Madre mountain range

References

External links 

 
 

 
Provinces of the Philippines
Provinces of Central Luzon
States and territories established in 1979
1979 establishments in the Philippines
Former sub-provinces of the Philippines